The Journal of Number Theory (JNT) is a bimonthly peer-reviewed scientific journal covering all aspects of number theory. The journal was established in 1969 by R.P. Bambah, P. Roquette, A. Ross, A. Woods, and H. Zassenhaus (Ohio State University). It is currently published monthly by Elsevier and the editor-in-chief is Dorian Goldfeld (Columbia University). According to the Journal Citation Reports, the journal has a 2020 impact factor of 0.72.

References

External links

Number theory
Mathematics journals
Publications established in 1969
Elsevier academic journals
Monthly journals
English-language journals